Carcroft is a rural village in the Metropolitan Borough of Doncaster, South Yorkshire, England. Historically part of the West Riding of Yorkshire, the village is roughly six miles north-north west of Doncaster. At the time of the 2011 Census the village fell within the ward of Adwick in the Doncaster MBC.

Geography
It borders woodland to the north which separates it from the neighbouring village of Owston. To the west the village merges with Skellow having subsumed the areas previously known as Hobcroft and Bullcroft. A string of small industrial estates connect it with Adwick le Street to the south. East of the village lies mixed farmland and woodland.

Like its neighbour to the west much of Carcroft is made up of former council housing estates (most of which had been colliery company housing). The old centre of the village remains with High Street supporting a variety of small independent shops. The furniture retailer DFS also began here as Northern Upholstery and a large outlet for the firm still stands on a small trading estate just off High Street opposite an Asda superstore. DFS Head office, factory and distribution centre is based a mile away at Adwick le Street. The village had a library until it was closed down in 2012 during the cutbacks imposed by the government.

History

A small portion of Carcroft is redeveloped land that had been occupied by the Bullcroft Colliery  which operated from 1912 until 1970 when it was merged underground with nearby Brodsworth Colliery. The viability of reopening this coal face has been under investigation  however as yet no moves to restore mining in the area have been made.

The village has two churches - the Church of England St Michael & all the Angels church, and the Catholic St George & the English Martyrs.

See also
Listed buildings in Adwick le Street and Carcroft

References

External links

 Health statistics for Carcroft
 Primary school
 Carcroft Motorcycle Park

Villages in Doncaster
Adwick le Street